"Rest in Sleaze" is the debut album by Swedish glam metal band Crashdïet. The album was produced by Platform (Chris Laney and Anders Ringman) and Grizzly/Tysper (Gustav Jonsson and Tommy Tysper). The album debuted at #12 on the Swedish album chart. The band released four singles from the album; "Riot in Everyone", "Knokk 'Em Down", "Breakin' the Chainz", and "It's a Miracle".

It is the first and only album that features late singer Dave Lepard, who committed suicide in 2006.

Track listing

Personnel
 Dave Lepard - vocals, guitar
 Martin Sweet - guitar
 Peter London - bass guitar
 Eric Young - drums

Charts

Album

Singles

References

External links
 Crashdїet Official Website

2005 debut albums
Crashdïet albums